Abdul Sattar Edhi (1928–2016) was a Pakistani philanthropist, ascetic, and humanitarian who founded the Edhi Foundation.

Edhi may also refer to:
Edhi Foundation

People with the name
Bilquis Edhi (born 1947), widow of Abdul Sattar Edhi
Edhi Handoko (1960–2009), Indonesian chess grandmaster
Edhi Sunarso (1932–2016), Indonesian sculptor and public artist